Soul Food is an American television drama series that aired on Showtime from June 28, 2000 to May 26, 2004.

Series overview

Episodes

Season 1 (2000–01)
As the series premieres, six months have passed since the events of the 1997 motion picture upon which the series is based.  The major principal cast members are Rockmond Dunbar (Kenny), Darrin Dewitt Henson (Lem), Aaron Meeks (Ahmad), Nicole Ari Parker (Teri), Malinda Williams (Bird) and Vanessa A. Williams (Maxine).  Recurring cast members include Boris Kodjoe (Damon) and Irma P. Hall (reprising her film role as Big Mama).  The opening theme song -- "The Way Love Goes"—is composed by Kenneth "Babyface" Edmonds and Al Green, and performed by Green himself.

Season 2 (2001–02)
At the start of Season 2, a new version of the opening theme song is introduced, performed by Al Green and Sy Smith.  This version is used for the remainder of the series.  Boris Kodjoe becomes a regular cast member.  A new opening credit sequence includes childhood pictures of the cast members (a device also used in the 1997 motion picture).

Season 3 (2002)
At the start of Season 3, a new opening credit sequence is introduced, depicting the seven major cast members interacting with each other backstage on the Soul Food set.

Season 4 (2003)

Season 5 (2004)
The opening credit sequence from the past two seasons is retained, though with all traces of Boris Kodjoe removed due to his departure from the main cast at the previous season's end. Kodjoe does return as a guest star in the final two episodes though.

External links
 

Soul Food